The 57th Utah State Legislature was elected Tuesday, November 7, 2006 and convened on Monday, January 15, 2007.

Dates of sessions 

 2007 General Session: January 15, 2007 - February 28, 2007
 2007 First Special Session: August 22, 2007
 2008 General Session: January 21, 2008 - March 5, 2008

Officers

Utah State Senate

Utah State House of Representatives

Leadership

Utah Senate 

 President of the Senate: John L. Valentine (R-14)

Majority (Republican) Leadership

 Majority Leader: Curt Bramble (R-16)
 Majority Whip: Dan R. Eastman (R-23)
 Assistant Majority Whip: Sheldon Killpack (R-21)
 Senate Rules Committee Chair: John W. Hickman (R-29)

Minority (Democratic) Leadership

 Minority Leader: Mike Dmitrich (D-27)
 Minority Whip: Gene Davis (D-3)
 Assistant Minority Whip: Ed Mayne (D-5)
 Minority Caucus Manager: Pat Jones (D-4)

Utah House of Representatives 

 Speaker of the House: Greg Curtis (R-49)

Majority (Republican) Leadership

 Majority Leader: Dave Clark (R-74)
 Majority Whip: Gordon E. Snow (R-54)
 Assistant Majority Whip: Brad Dee (R-11)
 House Rules Committee Chair: Stephen H. Urquhart (R-75)

Minority (Democratic) Leadership

 Minority Leader: Ralph Becker (D-24)
 Minority Whip: Brad King (D-69)
 Assistant Minority Whip: Carol Spackman Moss (D-37)
 Minority Caucus Manager: David Litvack (D-26)

Utah Senate

Committees

Make-up

Members

Utah House of Representatives

Committees

Make-up

Members

Employees/Staff 
 Legislative Research Library and Information Center
 Office of Legislative Printing
 Office of the Legislative Auditor General
 Office of the Legislative Fiscal Analyst
 Office of Legislative Research and General Counsel

See also 

 Government of Utah
 List of Utah State Legislatures

External links 
 Utah State Legislature
 2008 Election Results
 Office of the Governor

Legislature
57
2000s in Utah
2007 in Utah
2008 in Utah
2007 U.S. legislative sessions
2008 U.S. legislative sessions